David Jacobs is an American sociologist and professor emeritus of sociology at Ohio State University. He is known for his work in political sociology and political economy, which has included research on issues such as labor relations, policing, and capital punishment. For example, his research has found that death sentences are most common in U.S. states where lynchings were formerly the most frequent, and that black death row inmates convicted of killing whites are more likely to be executed than whites convicted of killing blacks. Jacobs also noted that U.S. states with the largest African American minorities were more likely to maintain the death penalty.

References

External links
Faculty page

Living people
Political sociologists
University of Georgia alumni
Vanderbilt University alumni
Ohio State University faculty
Year of birth missing (living people)